Raz (also Romanized as Rāz) is a city and capital of Raz and Jargalan District, in Raz and Jargalan County, North Khorasan Province, Iran. At the 2006 census, its population was 4,735, in 1,282 families.

Location 
It is bordered by Turkmenistan to the north and east and Maneh to the south and Bojnourd to the southwest, Golestan and Maneh to the west. From the tourist places of Razo Jorglan city, we can mention the beautiful springs and sycamores of Farahdin village.

References 

Cities in North Khorasan Province